Route 201 (known as the Osprey Trail) is a provincial road in the Canadian province of Newfoundland and Labrador. It is one of only three loop roads designated with a route number that starts and ends at the Trans-Canada Highway (Route 351, Norris Arm Road, and Route 404, Robinsons Road, are the others). The road spans , and allows for a scenic journey along the southern coast of Trinity Bay. There are quite a number of summer cottages along the route, and highway is known for an abundance of ospreys during the summer months.

The image of the osprey used in the logo on the Osprey Trail signage is believed to have been taken from the back of the 1989 issue of Canada’s ten-dollar bill.

Route description

Route 201 begins in Chapel Arm at an interchange between Route 1 (Trans-Canada Highway, Exit 27) and Route 202 (Long Harbour Road). It heads north to pass through downtown before leaving and passing along the coastline to pass through Norman's Cove-Long Cove. The highway now turns to the west and winds its way more inland for several kilometres before passing through Thornlea, Bellevue, and Bellevue Beach, where it has an intersection with Route 203 (Fair Haven Road). Route 201 winds its way along the coastline for a few kilometres to have an intersection with a local road leading to Chance Cove before heading west through hilly terrain to come to an end at another intersection with Route 1 (TCH).

As with most highways in Newfoundland and Labrador, the entire length of Route 201 is a two-lane highway.

Major intersections

References

201